Jupiter Reef or Jupiter Breakers is a supposed reef in the South Pacific (south of French Tuamotu islands and east of New Zealand), between other supposed reefs, Maria Theresa Reef to the south and Ernest Legouve Reef to the north; it appears to be a phantom reef.

The breakers were observed in two places, each of which had a diameter of about 30 yards, and appeared to be a quarter of a mile apart. No further intelligence has been obtained regarding this shoal.

Other nearby historically reported reefs which appear not to exist include Maria Theresa Reef, Ernest Legouve Reef, and Wachusett Reef.

References

Phantom islands
Reefs of the Pacific Ocean